The Bahrain men's national volleyball team represents Bahrain in international volleyball competitions and friendly matches. The team is currently ranked 131st in the world.

Competition history

Asian Championship
 1979 — 14th place
 1983 — Did not enter
 1987 — 8th place
 1989 — 16th place
 1991 — Did not enter
 1993 — Did not enter
 1995 — Did not enter
 1997 — 10th place
 1999 — 10th place
 2001 — Did not enter
 2003 — 13th place
 2005 — 10th place
 2007 — Did not enter
 2009 — Did not enter
 2011 — Did not enter
 2013 — 12th place
 2015 — 12th place
 2017 — Did not enter
 2019 — Did not enter
 2021 — 10th place

Asian Games
 1978 — 13th place
 1982 — Did not enter
 1986 — 8th place
 1990 — Did not enter
 1994 — Did not enter
 1998 — Did not enter
 2002 — Did not enter
 2006 — 8th place
 2010 — Did not enter
 2014 — Did not enter
 2018 — Did not enter

Asian Cup
 2022 —  Bronze Medal

Kit providers
The table below shows the history of kit providers for the Bahrain national volleyball team.

References

National sports teams of Bahrain
National men's volleyball teams
Volleyball in Bahrain